The Danish football champions are the winners of the highest league of football in Denmark. The title has been contested since 1913, in a varying form of competitions. Since 1991, the winners have been found through the Danish Superliga championship. The Danish football championship is governed by the Danish Football Association (DBU).

The early Danish football championships were decided in a single game, and the competition was not nationwide until its structure was altered before the 1927–28 season.  Until the 1950s, the winners' list included teams exclusively from the Copenhagen area. Kjøbenhavns Boldklub (KB) thus won 12 of its record 15 Danish championships before the 1954–55 season, when Køge Boldklub became the first non-Copenhagen team to be crowned Danish football champions.

A Danish champion has been found every year since 1913, except for 1915 and 1928. In 1915, the tournament was not played because of World War I. In 1928, there was no rule defined for the possibility that two or more teams had the same number of points at the end of the tournament, when three clubs all ended in first place.

History
Upon its founding in 1889, the Danish Football Association (DBU) inaugurated The Football Tournament contested by Copenhagen clubs only, though the winners are not considered official Danish champions. Upon the creation of the Copenhagen Football Association (KBU) in 1903, the administration of The Football Tournament was handed over to the newly founded regional football association, who went on to arrange yearly Copenhagen football championships. As the five other regional football associations emerged – namely Jutland FA (JBU), Zealand FA (SBU), Funen FA (FBU), Lolland-Falster FA (LFBU) and Bornholm FA (BBU) – they also started arranging championships for their own regions, parallel with the Copenhagen Championship.

The first Danish championship, the "National Football Tournament", was played from 1912 to 1913. Through to 1927, the championship was decided in a single final match, with the winner of KBU's Copenhagen football championship directly qualified to play the winner of a series of play-off games between the regional champions from the rest of Denmark. From 1914 to 1917, the runner-up team from the KBU tournament played a semi-final game against the best team from the rest of Denmark, with the winner facing the KBU champions in the Danish championship final. As the Copenhagen clubs were stronger than the provincial teams, this meant the final game ended up being contested by two clubs from Copenhagen.

Before the 1927–28 season, the first nationwide tournament, the "Denmark Tournament", was inaugurated. 20 teams were divided into five groups of four teams. They played each other once, and the five group winners qualified for a championship deciding group. Here they again played each other once, and the top placed team was declared champions after seven games in all. This lasted only two years before the league system was changed and the tournament renamed to the "Championship League" for the 1929–30 season. The teams were divided into two leagues, a championship series of ten teams and a promotion series with a varying number of clubs each year. This meant that the number of teams competing for the championship was fixed for the course of the tournament, and that every team played each other. The lowest placed team in the championship series and the top placed team in the promotion series would swap places between each season. From the start of the competition in 1929–30, the clubs played each other once to give a total of nine games a season, but from 1936 to 1937 they met twice in a season for a total of 18 games.

During the German occupation of Denmark in World War II from 1940 to 1945, the championship was again decided in a single final. The format varied throughout the occupation, as a differing number of teams played in three separate tournaments. The best placed teams in each tournament would go on to a string of play-off games, before two teams met in the final.

From the 1945–46 season, the competition reverted to the "Championship League" format, with the tournament now named the "1st Division". There were 10 teams in the top division once again, playing each other twice, with the lowest team being relegated. The 1953–54 season saw the first non-Copenhagen team win the Danish championship, when Køge Boldklub won the title. The championship title was not reclaimed by a Copenhagen team in more than ten years, until Akademisk Boldklub (AB) won the 1967 season.

From 1958, the Danish championship was arranged through one calendar year, and the 1956–57 season lasted 18 months with the teams playing each other thrice for a 27 games total. From 1958 to 1974, the tournament was expanded to 12 teams, playing each other twice for 22 games per season each, but now the bottom two teams faced relegation. The number of teams was increased to 16 for the 1975 season, which resulted in 30 games per season. In 1986, the number of participants was altered once more, this time decreasing the number of teams to 14, and the number of games to 26.

In 1991, the 1st Division was replaced by the "Danish Superliga", with only 10 teams participating. The opening Superliga season was played during the spring of 1991, with the ten teams playing each other twice for the championship title. For the following seasons the tournament structure was once more stretched over two calendar years. In the summer and autumn of 1991, the 10 teams played each other twice in the regular season of the tournament. In the following spring, the bottom two teams would be cut off, while the remaining eight teams entered the post-season tournament with their points cut in half and played each other twice once more, for a total of 32 games in a season. This practice was abandoned before the 1995–96 season, when the number of teams competing was increased to 12, playing each other thrice for 33 games per Superliga season. For the 2016–17 season the league was expanded to 14 teams, and a championship round involving the top 6 teams was introduced. For the 2020–21 season the league was reduced to 12 teams again, but the championship round remained.

Champions

Landsfodboldturneringen (1913–1927)

Danmarksmesterskabsturneringen (1928–1929)

Mesterskabsserien (1930–1940)

War Tournaments (1941–1945)

1st Division (1946–1990)

Danish Superliga (1991–present)

Total titles won
The following 20 clubs have won the top league in Danish football.

 Bold clubs play in top flight.
 Italic clubs merged and created superstructures.

Total titles won by city
The 20 title-winning clubs have come from a total of 10 cities. The most successful city is Copenhagen.

Notes

References

Sources
 Historien om Danmarksmesterskabet i fodbold at the Danish Football Association
 DanskFodbold.com by the Danish Football Association
 DANMARKSTURNERINGEN at Haslund.info
Denmark – List of Champions at RSSSF.com

Denmark
Danish Superliga
Danish 1st Division